Lucy Grig is a Senior Lecturer in Roman History and Head of Classics at the University of Edinburgh.

Career 
Grig was a lecturer at the University of Reading from 2000 to 2004, with a break during 2001 to 2002 to be a Rome Scholar at the British School at Rome. She is a member of the Governing Board of the International Late Antiquity Network, and previously a member of the committee for the Society for the Promotion of Roman Studies. Grig is an editor for Late Antiquity for the Oxford Classical Dictionary.

She was awarded a prestigious British Academy Mid-Career Fellowship for the academic year 2016-17, in order to pursue the project 'Popular Culture and the End of Antiquity in Southern Gaul, c. 400-550'.

In October 2017 she was part of the expert panel for Radio 4's In Our Time episode on Constantine and in November 2014 for the episode on Aesop.

Publications

Books

Edited volumes

Articles and chapters 

 'Caesarius of Arles and the campaign against popular culture in late antiquity', Early Medieval Europe, 26 (1) 2018, pp. 61–81
 'Life and death in Late Antiquity: Religious rituals and popular culture'. In: Lössl, J. and J. Nicholas, B. (eds.) A Companion to Religion in Late Antiquity. Malden, MA: Wiley-Blackwell, 2018, pp. 455–473
'Cities in the ‘long’ Late Antiquity, 2000–2012 – a survey essay', Urban History, 40 (3) 2013, pp. 554 – 566
 'Deconstructing the symbolic city: Jerome as guide to late antique Rome', Papers of the British School at Rome, 80 (2012) pp. 125–143
'Throwing parties for the poor: poverty and splendour in the late antique church'. In: Margaret Atkins, R. (ed.) Poverty in the Roman World. Cambridge University Press, 2006, pp. 145–161
 'Portraits, Pontiffs and the Christianization of Fourth-Century Rome', Papers of the British School at Rome, 72 (2004), pp. 203–230
 'Torture and Truth in Late Antique Martyrology', Early Medieval Europe, 11 (2002), pp. 321–336

External links 
University of Edinburgh Staff Profile Page: https://www.ed.ac.uk/history-classics-archaeology/about-us/staff-profiles/profile_tab1_academic.php?uun=lgrig

Short Interview: https://media.ed.ac.uk/media/Dr+Lucy+Grig+-+Popular+Culture+in+the+Ancient+World-+Research+in+a+Nutshell/1_hghg614d

References 

Living people
British women historians
Academics of the University of Edinburgh
Year of birth missing (living people)